Aghuls (Aghul: агулар/agular) are a people in Dagestan, Russia. According to the 2010 census, there were 34,160 Aghuls in Russia (7,000 in 1959). The Aghul language belongs to the Lezgian language family, a group of the Northeast Caucasian family. Ethnically, the Aghuls are close to the Lezgins. There are four groups of the Aghul people, who live in four different gorges: Aguldere, Kurakhdere, Khushandere, and Khpyukdere. Like their neighbors the Kaitaks, the Aghuls were converted to Islam at a fairly early date, subsequent to the Arab conquest of the eighth century. Their oral traditions claim Jewish descent.

Culture 

Each Aghul village had a village council, on which each of the three or four tukhums were represented. The council was headed by an elder. The village mullah and qadi also played an important role in local affairs. In some cases the wealthier tukhums exerted a disproportionate strong influence on village government. As elsewhere in Daghestan, the Aghuls were divided into tukhums (clans), comprising twenty to forty households. Each tukhum had its own cemetery, pastures, and hay fields, and the members were bound by obligations of mutual support and defense.

The Aghuls tended to practice endogamy within the tukhum—marriages with outsiders were very rare. In the past the Aghuls lived in extended family households, though not especially large ones (fifteen to twenty members, on average). A senior male, father or eldest brother, functioned as chief, with fairly broad authority over the affairs of the household and its members. Should the extended family split up, sisters—even those who had already married and left the household—received a portion of the land as well as the movable property. They were each apportioned one-half of the land share given to each of their brothers, a practice that was unusually generous by Daghestanian standards.

References

Further reading 
 The Red Book of the Peoples of the Russian Empire entry on Aguls

Lezgins
Ethnic groups in Dagestan
Muslim communities of Russia
Peoples of the Caucasus
Muslim communities of the Caucasus